France competed at the 2010 Summer Youth Olympics, the inaugural Youth Olympic Games, held in Singapore from 14 August to 26 August 2010.

The French squad consisted of 60 athletes competing in 18 sports: aquatics (diving, swimming), archery, athletics, badminton, basketball, boxing, canoeing, fencing, gymnastics, handball, judo, modern pentathlon, rowing, sailing, shooting, table tennis, taekwondo and triathlon.

Medalists

Archery

Boys

Girls

Mixed Team

Athletics

Boys
Track and Road Events

Girls
Track and Road Events

Field Events

Badminton

Boys

Girls

Basketball

Girls

Boxing

Boys

Canoeing

Boys

Girls

Diving

Girls

Fencing

Group Stage

Knock-Out Stage

Gymnastics

Artistic Gymnastics

Boys

Girls

Handball

Judo

Individual

Team

Modern pentathlon

Rowing

Sailing

Windsurfing

Shooting

Pistol

Rifle

Swimming

Boys

Girls

Mixed

 * raced in heats only

Table tennis

Individual

Team

Taekwondo

Triathlon

Men's

Mixed

References

External links
Competitors List: France – Singapore 2010 official site
 Schedule/Results – Singapore 2010 official site

2010 in French sport
Nations at the 2010 Summer Youth Olympics
France at the Youth Olympics